"Fresh Prince" is a song by French singer and rapper Soprano featuring Uncle Phil. It was released on 3 November 2014.

Charts

Weekly charts

Year-end charts

References

2014 songs
2014 singles
French-language songs